Jackson Masten Spencer Jr. (April 25, 1923 – June 15, 2004) was an American college basketball coach. He was the head coach at Iowa Wesleyan University from 1954 to 1959 and at the University of Nevada, Reno from 1959 to 1972.

He died of chronic obstructive pulmonary disease on June 15, 2004, in Davenport, Iowa at age 81.

References

1923 births
2004 deaths
American men's basketball coaches
Basketball coaches from Iowa
Basketball players from Iowa
Forwards (basketball)
Iowa Hawkeyes men's basketball coaches
Iowa Hawkeyes men's basketball players
Iowa Wesleyan Tigers men's basketball coaches
Nevada Wolf Pack men's basketball coaches
Sportspeople from Davenport, Iowa
Waterloo Hawks players